Tamer Abdelmoneim Hussein (born 22 November 1974 in Cairo) is an Egyptian taekwondo practitioner, who competed in the men's featherweight category. He captured two medals each in the men's 70-kg division at the World Taekwondo Championships (1991 and 1997), and attained a fifth-place finish at the 2004 Summer Olympics, representing his nation Egypt.

Hussein qualified as a 29-year-old for the Egyptian squad in the men's featherweight class (68 kg) at the 2004 Summer Olympics in Athens, by defeating Tunisia's Mohamed Omrani for the top spot and securing a berth from the African Olympic Qualifying Tournament in his native Cairo. Hussein lost his opening match 8–1 to Chinese Taipei's Huang Chih-hsiung, but slipped abruptly into the repechage for a chance to add another Olympic bronze medal for Egypt in the sport, following Huang's progress towards the final. In the repechage, Hussein redeemed from his ill-fated Olympic prelim feat to seal an adamant 8–4 victory over Austria's two-time Olympian Tuncay Çalışkan, before ending his Olympic run by plunging to a 6–8 decision against South Korea's Song Myeong-seob, relegating Hussein to fifth position.

References

External links

1974 births
Living people
Egyptian male taekwondo practitioners
Olympic taekwondo practitioners of Egypt
Taekwondo practitioners at the 2004 Summer Olympics
Sportspeople from Cairo
World Taekwondo Championships medalists
21st-century Egyptian people